I Guess This Is Goodbye is the fifth installment in The Emo Diaries series of compilation albums, released October 24, 2000 by Deep Elm Records. As with all installments in the series, the label had an open submissions policy for bands to submit material for the compilation, and as a result the music does not all fit within the emo style. As with the rest of the series, I Guess This Is Goodbye features mostly unsigned bands contributing songs that were previously unreleased.

Reviewer Johnny Loftus of Allmusic remarks that "Sonically, this volume of the series doesn't tread too far from the emo feedbag. The set vacillates between a rawer, post-hardcore sound (Cast Aside) and the drifting and/or driving traditional emo of groups like [Kerith] Ravine and Benji. This is not the strongest chapter of the Emo Diaries, but it will certainly offer enough thrills and chills for Deep Elm faithful."

Track listing

References

External links 
 I Guess This Is Goodbye at Deep Elm Records.

2000 compilation albums
Deep Elm Records compilation albums
Emo compilation albums
Indie rock compilation albums